Yuliya Stisyuk (11 September 2000) is a swimmer from Azerbaijan. She competed in 50 m, 100 m, 200 m backstroke events in 2014 FINA World Swimming Championships (25 m) and set a record of Azerbaijan swimmers in these disciplines. Stisyuk also competed in the 2015 European Games in Backstroke disciplines.

References

2000 births
Living people
Azerbaijani female swimmers
Swimmers at the 2015 European Games
European Games competitors for Azerbaijan
21st-century Azerbaijani women